The 1964 Senior League World Series took place from August 20–22 in Louisville, Kentucky, United States. Massapequa, New York defeated Brenham, Texas in the championship game. This was the only edition held in Louisville.

Teams

Results

References

Senior League World Series
Senior League World Series
Baseball competitions in Kentucky
Sports competitions in Louisville, Kentucky
1964 in sports in Kentucky